Alec Ounsworth (born December 1, 1977) is an American singer, songwriter, guitarist and frontman of indie rock band Clap Your Hands Say Yeah. He is also a member of The Pelican Picnic and Flashy Python. His first solo album, Mo Beauty was released October 20, 2009, on Anti- Records.

History

Ounsworth was born in Pennsylvania and grew up in Mount Airy, Philadelphia. Around his mid-teens, he started writing and recording music — a hobby that would stay near to him throughout his academic career at Connecticut College. In college, he shared a dorm room with Lee Sargent during their first year. They would both graduate in 2000.

Sargent, who had a special interest in Ounsworth's songs, contacted him in 2004 via Friendster about starting a band. After several contacts, Clap Your Hands Say Yeah was formed, and the band started playing live shows and recording demos.

Prior to the success of Clap Your Hands Say Yeah, Ounsworth released several home demos of his work onto the internet, many of them being early versions of songs that Clap Your Hands Say Yeah would record. All ties between him and the files have been severed, as both flashypython.com and his MySpace page have been deleted. The files are still distributed among fans over the Internet.

Musical equipment

Ounsworth's collection of guitars includes two Fender Telecasters, a Fender Stratocaster, a Gibson Hummingbird, and a Gibson SG. He also has at least four acoustic guitars, two of which are made by Gibson. On April 4, 2007, he sported a Gibson Flying V guitar on Clap Your Hands Say Yeah's appearance on Late Night with Conan O'Brien.

He employs the Vox AC30 amp to produce the sound he desires. On his tours with Clap Your Hands Say Yeah, he has played through a 4x10 Fender Hot Rod DeVille.

Personal life

On January 12, 2007, Ounsworth married Emily Jean Stock, who is the inspiration behind the song of the same name on the album Some Loud Thunder. In 2008, they had a daughter, Rosemary.

Discography

Solo albums
2009: Mo Beauty

with Clap Your Hands Say Yeah
2005: Clap Your Hands Say Yeah
2007: Some Loud Thunder
2007: Live at Lollapalooza 2007: Clap Your Hands Say Yeah
2011: Hysterical
2014: Only Run
2017: The Tourist
2021: New Fragility

with Flashy Python
2009: Skin and Bones

References

1977 births
Living people
American folk guitarists
American male guitarists
American folk singers
American rock guitarists
American male singer-songwriters
American rock singers
American rock songwriters
Connecticut College alumni
Chestnut Hill Academy alumni
Singer-songwriters from Pennsylvania
Guitarists from Philadelphia
21st-century American singers
21st-century American guitarists
21st-century American male singers
Anti- (record label) artists